Megalota ouentoroi is a species of moth of the family Tortricidae. It is found in New Caledonia in the southwest Pacific Ocean.

The wingspan is about 15 mm. The ground colour of the forewings is greyish white, strigulated (finely streaked) with greyish brown and suffused with greyish in the dorsal area. The hindwings are pale greyish brown.

Etymology
The species name refers to Ouen Toro, the type locality.

References

Moths described in 2013
Olethreutini